Kharvana (also Romanized as Kharvāna; also known as, Kharvanaq, is a city in Kharvana District of Varzaqan County, East Azerbaijan province, Iran. At the 2006 census, its population was 1,642 in 415 households. The following census in 2011 counted 1,373 people in 316 households. The latest census in 2016 showed a population of 3,353 people in 1,035 households.

References 

Varzaqan County

Cities in East Azerbaijan Province

Populated places in East Azerbaijan Province

Populated places in Varzaqan County